Newton's Cannon (1998) is a science fantasy novel by American writer Gregory Keyes, the first book in his The Age of Unreason series. The protagonist for the novel is Benjamin Franklin; other key characters to the novel are James Franklin – Ben's brother, John Collins – Ben's friend, as well as Adrienne and King Louis XIV – the Sun King.

The Age of Unreason Series
The other three novels of the series are:
A Calculus of Angels
Empire of Unreason
The Shadow of Gods

See also

Space gun

External links

References

Green, Roland. "New SF and fantasy books." Booklist 94.18 (15 May 1998): 1601.
KILLHEFFER, ROBERT K.J. "Books." Fantasy & Science Fiction 96.3 (Mar. 1999): 35.
Cassada, Jackie, et al. "Book reviews: Fiction." Library Journal 123.9 (15 May 1998): 118.
Steinberg, Sybil, and Jonathan Bing.. "Forecasts: Fiction." Publishers Weekly 245.15 (13 Apr. 1998): 57.

1998 American novels
1998 science fiction novels
American steampunk novels
American alternate history novels
Science fantasy novels
Novels by J. Gregory Keyes
Cultural depictions of Isaac Newton
Cultural depictions of Benjamin Franklin